Dillard is a neighborhood of the city of New Orleans.  A subdistrict of the Gentilly District Area, its boundaries as defined by the City Planning Commission are: Mirabeau Avenue to the north, Elysian Fields Avenue to the east, Benefit Street and I-610 to the south and Paris Avenue, Pratt Drive and the London Avenue Canal to the west.

Geography

Adjacent Neighborhoods
 St. Anthony (north)
 Gentilly Terrace (east)
 St. Roch (south)
 St. Bernard (west)
 Filmore (west)

Boundaries
The City Planning Commission defines the boundaries of Dillard as these streets: Mirabeau Avenue, Elysian Fields Avenue, Benefit Street, I-610, Paris Avenue, Pratt Drive and the London Avenue Canal.

Demographics
As of the census of 2000, there were 6,471 people, 2,609 households, and 1,581 families residing in the neighborhood.  The population density was 6,812 /mi2 (2,588 /km2).

As of the census of 2010, there were 4,373 people, 1,901 households, and 1,051 families residing in the neighborhood.

See also
 New Orleans neighborhoods
 Gentilly, New Orleans

References

Neighborhoods in New Orleans